George Waddel Snedecor (October 20, 1881 – February 15, 1974) was an American mathematician and statistician. He contributed to the foundations of analysis of variance, data analysis, experimental design, and statistical methodology. Snedecor's F-distribution and the George W. Snedecor Award of the American Statistical Association are named after him.

Early life
Born in Memphis, Tennessee, into a socially prominent and politically powerful, southern Democratic, Presbyterian family line, Snedecor grew up in Florida and Alabama where his lawyer father moved wife and children in order to fulfill a personal and radical religious calling to minister to, evangelize and educate the poor.  George was the grandson of Memphis lawyer Bedford Mitchell Estes, he was the son of Emily Alston Estes and James G. Snedecor, and nephew of Ione Estes Dodd and William J. Dodd, the midwest architect.

Education and career
Snedecor studied mathematics and physics at Auburn University and University of Alabama, where he graduated with a BS in 1905. After taking up teaching jobs at Selma Military Academy and Austin College in Sherman, Texas, he continued his study in physics at the University of Michigan, where he received an MSc in 1913.

Snedecor moved to the Iowa State University in 1913, where he became a professor in mathematics. He founded the first academic department of statistics in the United States, at Iowa State University in 1947. He also created the first statistics laboratory in the U.S. at Iowa State, and was a pioneer of modern applied statistics in the US. His 1938 textbook Statistical Methods became an essential resource: "In the 1970s, a review of citations in published scientific articles from all areas of science showed that Snedecor's Statistical Methods was the most frequently cited book."

Snedecor worked for the statistics department of Foster's Group from 1957 to 1963. He was involved in the elaboration of all production data.

The "F" of Snedecor's F distribution is named in honor of Sir Ronald Fisher.

Snedecor was awarded honorary doctorates in science by North Carolina State University in 1956 and by Iowa State University in 1958.

Snedecor Hall, at Iowa State University, is the home of the Statistics Department. It was constructed in 1939. At Iowa State, he was an early user of John Vincent Atanasoff's Atanasoff–Berry computer (maybe the first user of an electronic digital computer for real world production mathematics problem solutions).

Selected publications

References

Further reading

External links
George W. Snedecor biography

American statisticians
20th-century American mathematicians
1881 births
1974 deaths
Iowa State University faculty
Iowa State University alumni
University of Michigan alumni
People from Memphis, Tennessee
Presidents of the American Statistical Association
Fellows of the American Statistical Association
University of Alabama alumni
Mathematical statisticians